The Last Ten Seconds of Life is a deathcore band from Mansfield, Pennsylvania, formed in 2010.

History

The original lineup featured Storm Strope on vocals, Wyatt McLaughlin and Casey Quick on guitars, Thomas Giamanco on bass, and Christian Fisher on drums.

Despite the group's heavy sound, The Last Ten Seconds of Life borrowed their name from a lyric from the Smiths song "Stop Me If You Think You've Heard This One Before". Within a year of forming, they were touring regularly and had self-released their debut album, Know Your Exits. 
TLTSOL toured hard in support of the album, and by 2013 they had a new lineup: Quick was out, with McLaughlin handling all the guitar duties, and bassist Giamanco left, with Anthony Madara taking over the low end.

The independent metal label Density Records signed TLTSOL, and their second album, Invivo[Exvivo], appeared in October 2013.

As before, the group promoted the album through plenty of live work, and toured with other metal acts such as I Declare War, Fit for an Autopsy, Thy Art Is Murder, and Kublai Khan.

In 2014, the band returned to Atrium Audio in Lancaster, Pennsylvania—where Invivo[Exvivo] was created—to begin work on their next album.
When TLTSOL's third album, Soulless Hymns, arrived in January 2015, it quickly became the group's biggest success to date, debuting at number 22 on Billboard's Hard Rock Albums charts and number 14 on the Heatseekers Chart.

In October 2015, TLTSOL announced that Storm Strope had left the band, and John Robert Centorrino, who had previously sung with My Bitter End, had been recruited to fill in for him during a concert tour later in the year.
The band revealed that Centorrino had officially signed on as their new singer in May 2016, and a few months later, they returned to the studio to work on their next album.

The Violent Sound was released in November 2016, and like its predecessor, it immediately jumped into the Heatseekers Chart at number 14.

January 11, 2019 saw the release of the group's fifth studio album, Machina Non Grata. On October 5, 2021, the band announced they would release their self-titled sixth studio album on January 28, 2022.

On March 1, 2022, vocalist John Robert Centorrino, bassist Mike Menocker, and drummer Steven Sanchez departed the band without explanation. On August 29, a new lineup of the band was revealed, with Tyler Beam, Andrew Petway and Dylan Potts joining as vocalist, bassist and drummer, respectively. On October 26, the band released a new song and video for "Annihilation Phenomena", which was featured on their EP, Disquisition on an Execution that was released on November 25.

Timeline

Discography

Studio albums

EPs
 Justice (2010)
 Warpath (2012)
 Disquisition on an Execution (2022)

Compilations
 The Last Ten Seconds of Life: 2010–2012 (2014, Density Records, Workhorse Records)

References

American deathcore musical groups
Deathcore musical groups
Musical groups from Pennsylvania
Musical groups established in 2010
2010 establishments in Pennsylvania